Brian Green is an American baseball coach and former player, who is the current head baseball coach of the Washington State Cougars. He played college baseball at Riverside City College, Chapman University, and New Mexico State University between 1991 to 1994. He then served as the head coach of the New Mexico State Aggies (2015–2019). In 2019, he was hired at Washington State.

Coaching career

Assistant coach
Green served as an assistant baseball coach at New Mexico State University, Riverside City College, California State Polytechnic University, Pomona, Chapman University, Oregon State University, the University of San Diego, the University of Hawaii at Manoa, the University of California, Los Angeles, and the University of Kentucky.

New Mexico State
Green was named head baseball coach at New Mexico State University on July 31, 2014. Green was about to outline a plan for how he recruits hitters, which he applied during his first season a head coach. Green was about to help flip the Aggies culture quickly when the 2015 graduated 16 seniors, but he was about to recruit 35 players in his first class. Despite finishing second in the Western Athletic Conference in 2017, the Aggies were named the number 1 seed in the 2017 Western Athletic Conference baseball tournament because Grand Canyon University was ineligible for postseason play. On April 10, 2018, Green won his 100th game as the head coach of the Aggies. He had the Aggies clicking during the non-conference schedule, winning 11 of 12 at one point. Green was able to keep the Aggies rolling, turning their hot start into a WAC Tournament championship.

Washington State
On June 3, 2019, Green was hired to become the head coach for the Washington State Cougars baseball team.

Head coaching record

References

External links
 
 New Mexico State profile

Living people
Cal Poly Pomona Broncos baseball coaches
Chapman Panthers baseball coaches
Chapman Panthers baseball players
Hawaii Rainbow Warriors baseball coaches
Kentucky Wildcats baseball coaches
New Mexico State Aggies baseball coaches
New Mexico State Aggies baseball players
Oregon State Beavers baseball coaches
San Diego Toreros baseball coaches
UCLA Bruins baseball coaches
Riverside City Tigers baseball players
Washington State Cougars baseball coaches
Year of birth missing (living people)
National University (California) alumni